Arlo Finch in the Valley of Fire is a middle-grade fiction fantasy novel, written by American screenwriter John August. It was published on February 6, 2018 by Roaring Brook Press, an imprint of the Macmillan Children’s Publishing Group. It is the first book in a planned Arlo Finch trilogy, and is based on August's own experience as a Boy Scout.

In addition to English, the book is scheduled to be published in 11 other languages beginning in September 2018.

Reception 
Arlo Finch in the Valley of Fire has been generally well received. It currently has a 3.9/5 rating on Goodreads based on 703 ratings, and a 5/5 rating on Amazon based on 91 reviews.

Amazon's editors named Arlo Finch in the Valley of Fire as one of the "Best children's books of 2018 so far."

Booklist wrote: “Accomplished screenwriter August artfully thrusts readers into a whole new world, right alongside Arlo... This is just the first volume in a new series, so readers won’t have to wait long to plunge back into the mysterious Long Woods.”

Kirkus Reviews had a more mixed reaction: "Atmospheric at best, formulaic at worst".

Sequels 
August signed a deal with Roaring Brook Press to write an Arlo Finch trilogy. Arlo Finch in the Lake of the Moon was released February 5, 2019. After, Arlo Finch in the Kingdom of Shadows was released February 4, 2020.

Launch podcast 
In January 2018, August debuted Launch, a six-episode podcast series produced by Wondery that chronicles his experience writing, selling and releasing Arlo Finch, his debut novel. On its first day of release, Launch reached the top 10 on the iTunes podcast chart.

References 

2018 American novels
2018 fantasy novels
American fantasy novels
Roaring Brook Press books